Chah Haftad Tumani-ye Yek (also Romanized as Chāh Haftād Tūmānī-ye Yek; also known as ʿAbdol Ḩoseyn Eslāmlū (Persian: عبدالحسين اسلاملو) and Chāh Haftād Tūmānī) is a village in Golestan Rural District, in the Central District of Sirjan County, Kerman Province, Iran. At the 2006 census, its population was 40, in 11 families.

References 

Populated places in Sirjan County